Zeb-un-Nissa (15 February 1638 – 26 May 1702) was a Mughal princess and the eldest child of Emperor Aurangzeb and his chief consort, Dilras Banu Begum. She was also a poet, who wrote under the pseudonym of "Makhfi" ("Hidden, Disguised, Concealed One").

Imprisoned by her father in the last 20 years of her life at Salimgarh Fort, Delhi, Princess Zeb-un-Nissa is remembered as a poet, and her writings were collected posthumously as Diwan-i-Makhfi (Persian: ديوانِ مخفى) - "Complete (Poetical) Works of Makhfi".

Early years

Birth
Zeb-un-Nissa ("Ornament/ Beauty of Womankind"), the eldest child of Prince Muhi-ud-Din (later, Emperor Aurangzeb), was born on 15 February 1638 in Daulatabad, Deccan, exactly nine months after the marriage of her parents. Her mother, Dilras Banu Begum, was Aurangzeb's first wife and chief consort, and was a princess of the prominent Safavid dynasty; the ruling dynasty of Iran (Persia). Zeb-un-Nissa was her father's favourite daughter, and it was because of this that she could compel him to pardon people who had offended him.

Education and accomplishments

Aurangzeb charged Hafiza Mariam, one of the women of the court, with the education of Zeb-un-Nissa. She seems to have inherited her father's keenness of intellect and literary tastes, because Zeb-un-Nissa memorized the Quran in three years and became a Hafiza at the age of seven. This occasion was celebrated by her father with a great feast and the declaration of a public holiday. The princess was also given a reward of 30,000 gold pieces by her delighted father. Aurangzeb paid the princely sum of 30,000 gold pieces to the ustani (another name for "ustad") for having taught his cherished daughter well.

Zeb-un-Nissa then learned the sciences of the time with Mohammad Saeed Ashraf Mazandarani, who was also a great Persian poet. She learned philosophy, mathematics, astronomy, literature, and was a mistress of Persian, Arabic and Urdu. She had a good reputation in calligraphy as well. Her library surpassed all other private collections, and she employed many scholars on liberal salaries to produce literary works at her bidding or to copy manuscripts for her. Her library also provided literary works on each subject, such as law, literature, history and theology.

Zeb-un-Nissa was a kind-hearted person and always helped people in need. She helped widows and orphans. Not only did she help people per se, but also sent Hajj pilgrims to Mecca and Medina every year. She also took an interest in music and it was said that she was the best singer among the women of her time.

Aurangzeb's accession

When Aurangzeb became the emperor after Shah Jahan, Zeb-un-Nissa was 21 years old. Aurangzeb learnt of the talent and capacity of his daughter and began to discuss the political affairs of his Empire with her, listening to her opinions. It has been mentioned in some books that Aurangzeb sent all the royal princes for the reception of Zeb-un-Nisa each time she entered the court. Zeb-un-Nissa had four other younger sisters: Zeenat-un-Nissa, Zubdat-un-Nissa, Badr-un-Nissa and Mehr-un-Nissa.

Regarding her looks, "... she is described as being tall and slim, her face round and fair in colour, with two moles, or beauty-spots, on her left cheek. Her eyes and abundant hair were very black, and she had thin lips and small teeth. In Lahore Museum is a contemporary portrait, which corresponds to this description... In dress she was simple and austere; in later life she always wore white, and her only ornament was a string of pearls round her neck." Also with the way she dressed comes about her making an invention. " Zeb-un-Nissa invented a woman garment known as Angya Kurti. This was a modified form of the dress of the women of Turkestan. The modification was done to suit Indian conditions".

Zeb-un-Nissa lived in a period when many "great" poets were at the peak of their reputation; e.g. Mawlana Abdul Qader Bedil, Kalim Kashani, Saa'eb Tabrizi and Ghani Kashmiri. There is a noticeable influence of Hafez Sherazi's style on the poetry of Zeb-un-Nissa. However, she is considered as one of the poets of the Indian School of Poetry in Persian. "Zebunnisa was trained in the serious study of religious doctrine and in matters in faith, and she was known as an excellent scholar in several academic areas and as a literary figure and patron of some renown. She sang well and composed songs and planted many of the gardens of her day."

Zeb-un-Nissa selected "Makhfi" (which means "Hidden One" in Persian) as her pen-name in her poetry. In addition to her poetic book or collection of poems, called Diwan, which contains approximately 5,000 verses, she also wrote the following books: Monis 'ul-Roh, Zeb 'ul-Monsha’at (زیب‌ المنشآت / زيب المنشئات, "Literary Compositions of Zeb") and Zeb 'ul-Tafāsir (زيب التفاسير, "Tafsirs of Zeb"), the first and only tafsir written by a woman. In Makhzan 'ul-Ghaib (مخزن الغيب), the author writes that the poetic book of Zeb-un-Nissa contained 15,000 verses. Zeb-un-Nissa encouraged compilations and translations of various works also.

Later years, imprisonment and death

There are multiple conflicting accounts offering explanations for the circumstances which ultimately led to her imprisonment at Salimgarh Fort, Delhi, at the edge of Shahjahanabad (present Old Delhi). In 1662, when Aurangzeb was taken ill and his physicians prescribed a change in the environment, he took his family and court with him to Lahore. At that time Akil Khan Razi, the son of his Vizier, was Governor of that city. In the following period, Akil Khan and Zeb-un-Nissa allegedly had a brief yet failed affair, after which Aurangzeb began to distrust her and later imprisoned her. Other theories suggest that she was imprisoned for being a poetess and a musician (both anathema to Aurangzeb's austere, more orthodox and fundamental way of life and thinking). Yet another explanation points to her correspondence with her younger brother, Muhammad Akbar. She supported the young prince in the inevitable ongoing conflict of succession, and was discovered to have written to him during the rebellion in 1681 AD (over the course of which, he had publicly accused Aurangzeb of transgressions against Islamic law). Her punishment was to have her accumulated wealth confiscated, her annual pension of 4 lakhs nullified, and that she was to be held prisoner at Salimgarh until her death.

It was here, after 20 years of imprisonment, Zeb-un-Nissa died after seven days of illness, still captive in Shahjahanabad while Aurangzeb was on a trip to the Deccan. Conflicting sources state the date of her death alternately as 1701 AD and 1702 AD.
Her tomb was in the garden of "Thirty thousand trees" (Tees Hazari), outside of the Kashmiri Darwaza, the north gate of the city. But when the railway line was laid out by the British at Delhi, her tomb with its inscribed tombstone was shifted to Akbar's mausoleum at Sikandra, Agra. There is also a tomb in Nawankot, Lahore, Pakistan, but its authenticity is doubtful. Haroon Khalid infers that the apocryphal association of Zeb-un-Nisa with the tomb in Lahore came about after the defeat of rebel prince Dara Shikoh in the Mughal war of succession (1657–1661), with the supporters of Shikoh (who had spent time in Lahore) transferring their aspirations to the rebellious princess by connecting her with the tomb even though she remained buried in Delhi and later  at Agra. 
 
In 1724, years after her death, her scattered and extant writings were collected under the name Diwan-i-Makhfi, literally, the Book of the Hidden One. It contained four hundred and twenty-one ghazals and several ruba'is. Subsequently, in 1730 other ghazals were added to the manuscript, which was also illuminated.

Personal life

Zeb-un-Nissa did not get married and remained single her whole life, despite the fact that she had many suitors. This also came with the rise of speculative gossip about secret lovers and palace trysts.

Zeb al-Nisa had four other younger sisters: Zeenat un-Nissa, Zubdat-un-Nissa, Badr-un-Nissa and Mihr-un-Nissa.
 
Her grandfather, Emperor Shah Jahan, had betrothed her to her first cousin, Prince Sulaiman Shikoh, the eldest son of her paternal uncle, Crown Prince, Dara Shikoh. Shah Jahan had intended for her to become a future Mughal empress as Sulaiman was the heir to Dara Shikoh, who was next in line for succession to the Mughal throne after Shah Jahan. The marriage would've been a perfect match but did not, however, take place, due to Aurangzeb's reluctance; who despised his older brother. The King of Iran, Shah Abbas II's son Mirza Farukh also wanted to marry her. Many other proposals also came to her, but she demanded that before the fixation of marriage, she would see the princes.

Zeb-un-Nissa spent all her life on literary works and poetry, as she herself said:

In some books it has been written that there was a secret love affair between Zeb-un-Nissa and Aqil Khan Razi, a poet and the Governor of Lahore. However, others disagree with the prior theory. For example, in her poetic book (Diwan), some would argue that one cannot find a single Ghazal which supports this point, and that all of her poems are based on the Sufi concept of the Love of God.

According to certain sources, "dehumanizing" scandals (created and/or written by some foreigners) regarding the lives of Mughal ladies were not uncommon (during the post-Renaissance era). For example, a claim of: "A sordid episode of [Zeb-un-Nissa's] carnal romance with Aqil Khan Razi and his death inside a hot cauldron with burning fire under it, gained wider currency and was eagerly picked up by the... populace." However, other sources state that Razi lived long (as a government official) and died naturally.

Legacy
Her poetic book was printed in Delhi in 1929 and in Tehran in 2001. Its manuscripts are in the National Library of Paris, the library of the British Museum, the University of Tübingen library in Germany and in the Mota library in India.  The garden which she laid out in Lahore itself and which was called the Chauburji, or four-towered, can still be traced by portions of the walls and gates remaining.

Ancestry

Sample translation
Her Ghazal tells the story of love:

 You with the dark curly hair and the breathtaking eyes,
 your inquiring glance that leaves me undone.

 Eyes that pierce and then withdraw like a blood-stained sword,
 eyes with dagger lashes!
 Zealots, you are mistaken – this is heaven.

 Never mind those making promises of the afterlife:
 join us now, righteous friends, in this intoxication.

 Never mind the path to the Kaabah: sanctity resides in the heart.
 Squander your life, suffer! God is right here.

 Oh excruciating face! Continual light!
 This is where I am thrilled, here, right here.

 There is no book anywhere on the matter.
 Only as soon as I see you do I understand.

 If you wish to offer your beauty to God, give Zebunnisa
 a taste. Awaiting the tiniest morsel, she is right here.

Translated by Sally Lee Stewart, Elena Bell and Maksuda Joraeva.

Works

References

Bibliography
 
 Chopra, R. M., "Eminent Poetesses of Persian", 2010, Iran Society, Kolkata.

External links

"The first fifty Ghazals of Diwan-e Makhfi" printed in London, 1913
"The Tears of Zebunnissa" printed in London, 1913
"Palace of Zeb-un-Nissa"
"Diwan e Makhfi -scanned poems collection of Zebunnisa in original Persian
The Friday Times: The poet princess – Sohaib Arshad discovers the diwan of Zebunnissa
Studies in Mughal India. Chapter-IV by Jadunath Sarkar
Story of Aurangzeb's daughter Zeb-un-Nissa at Navbharat Gold
 

1638 births
1702 deaths
Mughal princesses
Mughal nobility
Indian princesses
Indian Sufis
Sufi poets
17th-century Indian women writers
17th-century Indian writers
17th-century Indian poets
Persian-language women poets
Persian-language poets
Indian women poets
Indian people of Iranian descent
People from Agra
Women of the Mughal Empire
Timurid dynasty
Indian female royalty
Poets from Uttar Pradesh
Daughters of emperors